John Walker (October 15, 1770 – May 26, 1838) was a U.S. politician from Missouri.

John Walker was born in Brunswick County, Virginia. He later moved to Kentucky, and eventually settled in Howard County, Missouri in 1818. His wife Sarah Caffery, whom he married in 1800, was a niece of Rachel Jackson, the wife of Andrew Jackson. Walker was a member of a prominent Kentucky political family, and was the brother of U.S. Senator George Walker and U.S. Congressman David Walker and the uncle of James D. Walker, David S. Walker and Richard K. Call. His son John George Walker served as a Confederate general during the Civil War.

A decade after moving to Missouri, Walker was elected to the Missouri State Senate representing Howard County. He was elected as State Treasurer of Missouri in 1833. According to legend, he never kept the Treasurer's office locked or bolted, but secured government funds in an iron-bound oaken chest, and reportedly slept on top of the chest at night. Following his death in office in May, 1838, $400 in government funds were reported missing. Nonetheless, he was exonerated by the Missouri General Assembly on charges of misappropriation of funds. Several years later, the missing money was discovered in between the metal lining and walls of the chest.

References
 Missouri State Treasurer Scott Fitzpatrick-Past Treasurers Biography

1770 births
1838 deaths
State treasurers of Missouri
Democratic Party Missouri state senators
People from Brunswick County, Virginia
People from Howard County, Missouri
Andrew Jackson family